Transmembrane and Tetratricopeptide repeat containing 4 is a protein that in humans is encoded by the TMTC4 gene. This protein crosses the plasma membrane 10 times, and resides in the ER lumen and cytosol. The predicted structure of the TMTC4 protein is a series of alpha-helices.

Gene 

TMTC4 is located on chromosome 13 at 13q32.3. The gene is flanked by ADP ribosylation factor 4 pseudogene 3 (ARF4P3) on the left, and ribosomal protein S26 pseudogene 47 (RPS26P47) on the right. TMTC4 spans 4043 bp and has a total of 23 exons.

mRNA 

TMTC4 has seven isoform variants, the most common being isoform 1 at 4043 bp.

The 5’ UTR for TMTC4 is short and in many of the shorter isoforms, portions of this untranslated region are cut. In comparison, the 3’ UTR is long and is often complete across the seven isoforms.

Protein

Physical properties 

The molecular weight for TMTC4 is 85.0 kdal, and there are no positive, negative, or neutral clusters of amino acids or charge runs exceeding the normal lengths. When looking at a distant ortholog (purple sea urchin) the molecular weight of TMTC4 is 85.5 kdal and there, again, are no charge runs, positive, negative or neutral clusters, or unusual spacings.  There are strong similarities in protein composition across species. The isoelectric point for the domain of unknown function (DUF 1736) is lower than that of the protein overall.

Domains 

TMTC4 has ten transmembrane regions, all of them spaced within the first half of the protein.

TMTC4 is layered with tetratricopeptide (TPR) repeat sequences that are a part of the TPR superfamily of proteins. DUF1736 is present upstream of the TPR region.  A seven residue repeat (SRR) is located toward the end of the protein, and it is thought to encode a coiled-coil structure. Another member of the TPR family, PFTA (protein prenyltransferases alpha subunit repeat), is located within the protein’s TPR region and is believed to be involved in signal transduction and vesicular traffic regulation. LSPR coagulation factor V, also a repeat motif, is located within the TPR region, and is thought to be a central regulator of hemostasis.

Secondary structure 

TMTC4 takes on a series of alpha-helix structures, especially within the TPR region, though there are a minimal amount of beta-strand structures spaced throughout the beginning half of the protein.

Post-translational modifications 

There are four predicted nuclear localization signals, each tagging the protein for nuclear import. At the very end of the protein, however, there is a predicted ER retention signal which would prevent the protein from leaving the ER. The protein has three predicted N-glycosylation sites, potentially altering its structure and function and there are ten predicted phosphorylation sites, each a possible activation site for a regulatory mechanism.

Expression 

TMTC4 is expressed in all human tissues. The gene, however, is most highly expressed in the brain and in the spinal cord.

Protein abundance seems to be lower than normal for TMTC4.

Regulation 

There is one possible promoter for the TMTC4 gene, located in the 5’ UTR but before the start of the coding sequence.

Function 

Currently the function of TMTC4 has not been characterized.

Interacting proteins 

Possible interacting proteins are NRG1, PEX19, HERC3, TXNDC15, and COL1A1 . All of these were detected through affinity chromatography.

Homology

Orthologs 

Ortholog space for TMTC4 spans a large portion of evolutionary time. TMTC4 is present in mammals, reptiles, amphibians, birds, fish, and invertebrates. It is not present in plants, bacteria, archaea, or fungi.

Paralogs 

Paralog space for TMTC4 spans the gene family TMTC. There are four genes in this gene family: TMTC1, TMTC2, TMTC3, and TMTC4. TMTC1 and TMTC3 split from TMTC4 about 1200 million years ago, while TMTC2 split from TMTC4 1400 million years ago. Both of these events happened somewhere between invertebrates and plants.

References

Further reading 

 
 
 
 
 
 

Biology of bipolar disorder